Mary of Guelders (c. 1434/1435 – 1 December 1463)  was Queen of Scotland by marriage to King James II of Scotland. She ruled as regent of Scotland from 1460 to 1463.

Background
She was the daughter of Arnold, Duke of Guelders, and Catherine of Cleves. She was a great-niece of Philip the Good, Duke of Burgundy.

Burgundian court
Philip and his wife Isabella of Portugal at first planned to have Mary betrothed to Charles, Count of Maine, but her father could not pay the dowry. Mary stayed on at the Burgundian court, where Isabella frequently paid for her expenses. Mary attended Isabella's daughter-in-law Catherine of France, while she herself was attended upon by ten people. The duke and duchess then started negotiations for a Scottish marriage. Philip promised to pay her dowry, while Isabella paid for her trousseau. William Crichton came to the Burgundian court to escort her back to Scotland.

Queen of Scotland
Mary landed in Scotland in June 1449. Her arrival was described by Mathieu d'Escouchy. She first visited the Isle of May and the shrine of St Adrian. Then she came to Leith and rested at the Convent of St Anthony. Both nobles and the common people came to see her as she made her way to Holyrood Abbey in Edinburgh. Mary married King James II of Scotland at Holyrood Abbey on 3 July 1449. A sumptuous banquet was given, while the Scottish king gave her several presents. Immediately after the marriage ceremony, she was dressed in purple robes and crowned queen by Abbot Patrick. It had been agreed that any sons they might have would have no right to the duchy of Guelders.

Queen Mary was granted several castles and the income from many lands from James, which made her independently wealthy. In May 1454, she was present at the siege of Blackness Castle, and when it resulted in the victory of the king, he gave it to her as a gift. She made several donations to charity, such as when she founded a hospital just outside Edinburgh for the indigent; and to religion, such as when she benefited the Franciscan friars in Scotland.

Regency
After her husband's death, Mary ruled as regent for their son James III of Scotland until her own death three years later. Mary was drawn into the Wars of the Roses taking place in England at this time. She appointed Bishop James Kennedy as her chief advisor; their companionship was described as well-functioning despite the fact that the bishop favoured an alliance with the Lancastrians, while Mary at first wanted to continue playing off the warring parties in England against each other.

While Mary was still mourning the death of her husband, the English queen of the House of Lancaster, Margaret of Anjou, fled north across the border seeking refuge from the Yorkists. Mary sympathetically aided Margaret and took Edward of Westminster into her household to keep them out of Yorkist hands. Mary's dealings with Margaret were mainly to provide aid to the deposed queen. Mary gave a number of Scottish troops to help Margaret and the Lancastrian cause. Mary and Margaret also organised a betrothal between Margaret's son, Edward, and Mary's daughter Margaret in 1461. In return for her support, Mary asked for the town of Berwick on the Anglo-Scottish border, which Margaret was willing to give up. Relations between the two women deteriorated, however, with the increasingly friendly alliance between King Edward IV of England and Duke Philip of Burgundy. Any support by Mary for Margaret, Edward IV's enemy, threatened the alliance that Philip wanted with Edward IV against King Louis XI of France.

Edward IV tried to put a stop to Mary's support of Margaret by proposing marriage to the widowed queen, which Mary rejected. Mary's uncle, Duke Philip, pressured her to call off the betrothal of her daughter and Margaret's son, to Margaret's disappointment. In 1462, she paid the Lancastrian royals to leave Scotland and made peace with Edward IV. She also hinted at the possibility of a marriage between herself and the new English king. Mary, reportedly, had several affairs during her period as regent, notably one with the Lord Hailes.

Mary went ahead with James II's plan to build a castle on land at Ravenscraig, designed to withstand the use of artillery, and lived in it while it was under construction until her death.

Trinity College Church
Mary founded Trinity College Church ca. 1460 in memory of her husband.  The church, located in the area now known as Edinburgh's Old Town, was demolished in 1848 to make way for Waverley station, although it was partially reconstructed on a different site in 1870 under the name Trinity Apse.

Upon her death, Mary was at first interred at Trinity College Church, but her body was moved to Holyrood Abbey in Edinburgh when discovered in 1848. David Laing, a member of the Society of Antiquaries of Scotland in 1848, stated that the move was made on July 15 of that year. However, Laing raised the possibility that the first female skeleton discovered at Trinity College Church and assumed to be the queen was not, in fact, Mary of Guelders. He argues that the second female skeleton discovered, which was in a more prominent location in the church and more likely to have been the site of a royal burial, could well have been Mary. That person was also reinterred at Holyrood. The first reinterment was in the royal vault; the second, near the entrance. Daniel Wilson, last surviving member of the Society of Antiquaries of Scotland, disputed Laing's theory and maintained that the first reburial was indeed that of Mary of Guelders. Wilson also explained that since Mary died before the building of the collegiate church was finished, her obsequies had been held at Brechin Cathedral before the burial at Trinity College Church.

Issue
James and Mary had seven children together:

An unnamed son. (Both born and died on 19 May 1450).
James III of Scotland (1451–1488).
Mary (May 1453-May 1488), who married first Thomas Boyd, 1st Earl of Arran, and secondly James Hamilton, 1st Lord Hamilton. She became the mother of James Hamilton, 1st Earl of Arran.
Alexander Stewart, Duke of Albany (c. 1454 - 1485).
David Stewart, Earl of Moray (c. 1455 - 1457). He was created Earl of Moray on 12 February 1456.
Margaret (c. 1456 - ca. 1480/1500?), who married William Crichton, 3rd Lord Crichton of Auchingoul. She became the mother of Margaret Crichton and mother-in-law of George Leslie, 4th Earl of Rothes.
John Stewart, 1st Earl of Mar and Garioch (c. 1459 - 1479).

Notes

References 
 

 
 Richard Oram: The Kings and Queens of Scotland  
 Timothy Venning: The Kings and Queens of Scotland 
 Mike Ashley: British Kings and Queens 
 Elizabeth Ewan, Sue Innes and Sian Reynolds: The Biographical Dictionary of Scottish Women

External links
Biography

1430s births
1463 deaths
15th-century Scottish women
15th-century viceregal rulers
15th-century women rulers
Burials at Holyrood Abbey
Mary of Guelders
Mary of Guelders
Medieval Dutch nobility
Medieval Dutch women
People from Grave, North Brabant
Mary of Guelders
Mary of Guelders
Queen mothers